You Will Be a Duchess (French: Tu seras Duchesse) is a 1932 French romantic comedy film directed by René Guissart and starring Marie Glory, Fernand Gravey and Pierre Etchepare. It was made at the Joinville Studios by the French subsidiary of Paramount Pictures.

Cast
 Marie Glory as Annette Poisson  
 Fernand Gravey as Marquis André de la Cour  
 Pierre Etchepare as Le duc de Barfleur fils  
 Geneviève Doriane as Couquette  
 Pierre Feuillère as Leon  
 Paul Clerget as Le duc de Barfleur père 
 Jean Gobet as Le docteur  
 Claude Marty as L'abbé  
 André Berley as Monsieur Poisson  
 Fifiou
 Sem 
 Geo Leroy 
 Habib Benglia

References

Bibliography 
 Dayna Oscherwitz & MaryEllen Higgins. The A to Z of French Cinema. Scarecrow Press, 2009.

External links 
 

1932 films
1930s romantic musical films
French musical comedy films
1930s French-language films
Films directed by René Guissart
Films shot at Joinville Studios
1932 romantic comedy films
French black-and-white films
French romantic comedy films
1930s French films